WVTS is a News/Talk formatted broadcast radio station licensed to Dunbar, West Virginia, serving Charleston and Nitro in West Virginia.  WVTS is owned and operated by Bristol Broadcasting Company.

F.M. translator

References

External links

1946 establishments in West Virginia
News and talk radio stations in the United States
Radio stations established in 1946
VTS